{{DISPLAYTITLE:Kir6.2}}

Kir6.2 is a major subunit of the ATP-sensitive K+ channel, a lipid-gated inward-rectifier potassium ion channel. The gene encoding the channel is called KCNJ11 and mutations in this gene are associated with congenital hyperinsulinism.

Structure
It is an integral membrane protein. The protein, which has a greater tendency to allow potassium to flow into a cell rather than out of a cell, is controlled by G-proteins and is found associated with the sulfonylurea receptor (SUR) to constitute the ATP-sensitive K+ channel.

Pathology
Mutations in this gene are a cause of familial persistent hyperinsulinemic hypoglycemia of infancy (PHHI), an autosomal recessive disorder characterized by unregulated insulin secretion. Defects in this gene may also contribute to autosomal dominant non-insulin-dependent diabetes mellitus type II (NIDDM).

See also
 Inward-rectifier potassium ion channel
 Potassium channel

References

Further reading

External links
  GeneReviews/NCBI/NIH/UW entry on Familial Hyperinsulinism
  GeneReviews/NCBI/NIH/UW entry on Permanent Neonatal Diabetes Mellitus
 
 

Ion channels